The TSV Handschuhsheim is a German rugby union club from Heidelberg, currently playing in the Rugby-Bundesliga. Apart from rugby, the club also offers other sports like association football, handball and tennis.

History
The club was formed in 1886 in Handschuhsheim, a suburb of Heidelberg, one of the centres of German rugby.

For most of its existence, it has stood in the shadow of the other, more successful rugby clubs in town, the SC Neuenheim, Heidelberger RK and RG Heidelberg.

TSV had a breakthrough in 1953, when it reached the German championship final for the first time. It played in three more finals in the next four years, winning its sole championship in 1957. Three more final appearances followed in the 1960s.

With the establishment of the Rugby-Bundesliga in 1971, success dropped off for the team and after one more finals appearance in 1978 a long drought followed.

After a 27-year title-wait, TSV took out the German Cup in 2005 but lost the championship final that year. Both games were against DRC Hannover.

In 2008 it won the cup once more, beating German champions RG Heidelberg, 24–23, after extra time in front of 1,000 spectators.

In 2008–09, the club sat in fourth place at the winter break with good chances of making it into the expanded finals, where the top-four now qualified but narrowly missed those with a sixth-place finish. Its reserve team played in the 2nd Bundesliga South/West this season. The club also reached the German Cup final once more, losing to champions SC 1880 Frankfurt.

The 2010–11 season saw the club finish third, behind the two professional outfits Heidelberger RK and SC 1880 Frankfurt, prompting it to be referred to as German amateur champions. It also saw the retirement of its most reliable try-scorer Alexander Pipa at the end of the season. TSV finished fifth in their group in the 2012–13 season and failed to qualify for the championship round, instead entering the second tier DRV-Pokal, where it came first in the south/west division. The club took out the German Cup with a 42–10 victory over Heidelberger TV. The club's reserve team took out the championship in the 3rd Liga South/West.

In 2013–14 the team qualified for the championship and the play-offs in the Rugby-Bundesliga, defeating SC Germania List, 31–22, in the first round and being knocked out by TV Pforzheim in the quarter finals. In the 2014–15 season the club finished fifth in the south-west championship group and was knocked out by Heidelberger RK in the quarter finals of the play-offs after a first-round victory over SC Germania List.

The club's rugby department had a membership of 360 in 2007.

Club honours
 German rugby union championship
 Champions: 1957
 Runners up: 1953, 1955, 1956, 1960, 1963, 1968, 1978, 2005
 German rugby union cup
 Winner: 2005, 2008, 2013
 Runners up: 1978, 2009, 2016
 German sevens championship
 Champions: 2004

Recent seasons

Men: First team
Recent seasons of the club:

 Until 2001, when the single-division Bundesliga was established, the season was divided in autumn and spring, a Vorrunde and Endrunde, whereby the top teams of the Rugby-Bundesliga would play out the championship while the bottom teams together with the autumn 2nd Bundesliga champion would play for Bundesliga qualification. The remainder of the 2nd Bundesliga teams would play a spring round to determine the relegated clubs. Where two placing's are shown, the first is autumn, the second spring. In 2012 the Bundesliga was expanded from ten to 24 teams and the 2nd Bundesliga from 20 to 24  with the leagues divided into four regional divisions.

Reserve team

Rugby internationals
In Germany's 2006–08 European Nations Cup campaign, Thorsten Wiedemann, Sebastien Chaule, Jens Schmidt, Alexander Pipa and Alexander Hug were called up for the national team.

In the 2008–10 campaign, Wiedemann, Chaule, Hug, Pipa and Schmidt all appeared for the TSV and Germany again, while Alexander Metz was a new addition to the club's list of internationals.

In the 2010–12 campaign, Sven Wetzel, Rob May and Felix Bayer were new additions to the club's list of German internationals, while Jens Schmidt and Alexander Hug were re-selected for the side.

The club had three players selected for the German under-18 team at the 2009 European Under-18 Rugby Union Championship, these being Matthias Marin, Sebastian Kößler and Konstantin Hoffmann. Of these, Sebastian Kößler also played at the 2010 tournament.

Coaches
Recent coaches of the club:

References

External links
  Official website
 TSV Handschuhsheim team info at totalrugby.de

German rugby union clubs
Rugby clubs established in 1886
Rugby union in Heidelberg
1886 establishments in Germany